Stefan Jacobsson (born 30 December 1982 in Donsö, Sweden) was the leader of the now defunct Party of the Swedes.

Jacobsson got involved in Neo-Nazism when he was sixteen in the late 1990s. He was also a member of the Swedish Resistance Movement. In 2005, he was sentenced for rioting during a demonstration.

Jacobsson has also been involved in armed attacks against people.

References

External links 

1982 births
Leaders of political parties in Sweden
Living people
Swedish neo-Nazis
People from Gothenburg
Neo-Nazi politicians